The 2017–18 Coupe de France preliminary rounds, Bourgogne-Franche-Comté make up the qualifying competition to decide which teams from the Bourgogne-Franche-Comté region teams take part in the main competition from the seventh round.

First round 
The matches in Bourgogne-Franche-Comté were played on 19 and 20 August 2017. Some tiers are not yet known because lower level divisions have not been finalised.

First round results: Bourgogne-Franche-Comté

Second round 
These matches were played on 26 and 27 August 2017.

Second round results: Bourgogne-Franche-Comté

Third round 
These matches were played on 9 and 10 September 2017.

Third round results: Bourgogne-Franche-Comté

Fourth round 
These matches were played on 23 and 24 September 2017.

Fourth round results: Bourgogne-Franche-Comté

Fifth round 
These matches were played on 7 and 8 October 2017.

Fifth round results: Bourgogne-Franche-Comté

Sixth round 
These matches were played on 21 and 22 October 2017.

Sixth round results: Bourgogne-Franche-Comté

References 

2017–18 Coupe de France